The Miss Brazil 2001 pageant took place March 26, 2001. Each state and the Federal District competed for their state and went win the title of the Brazilian Crown. The winner would enter Miss Universe 2001. Miss Internacional Brazil would enter Miss International 2001. This year was the first time that Miss Brazil World was separated from the pageant for only 1 year with winner of that contest competing at Miss World 2001.

Results

Special Awards
Miss Internet - Michelly Prado
Miss Congeniality - Ana Nimer
Miss Photogenic - Michelly Prado
Best National Costume - Jaqueline de Brito 

Delegates

 - Lucimara Fernandes
 - Aline Canedo Souza
 - Jakeline Almeida Amanajás
 - Cláudia Danielle Bueno de Carvalho
 - Oldeane Ribeiro da Fonseca
 - Orleide Ferreira Castro
 - Danielle Gonçalves
 - Wanusa Aparecida de Paula
 - Michelly Prado Borges
 - Zoraide Campos
 - Luciane Patrícia Locatelli
 - Ana Flora Nimer Gomes
 - Fernanda Tinti Borja Pinto
 - Geruzah da Costa Souza
 - Andréia Aravanos Sarinho
 - Ticiana Milanese Franco
 - Débora Daggy
 - Emannuelle Aguiar
 - Raquel Farias
 - Andréia de Moraes
 - Juliana Dornelles Borges
 - Jaqueline Aparecida de Brito
 - Carol de Paula
 - Simone Régis
 - Joyce Yara Aguiar
 - Karina da Costa Barreto 
 - Nathália Lourenço Rodrigues

External links
 Official site (in Portuguese)

2001
2001 in Brazil
2001 beauty pageants